Alyah Chanelle Scott (born July 3, 1997) is an American actress. She is best known for her roles as Whitney Chase on the 2021 HBO Max series The Sex Lives of College Girls and as Timberly Fox on the 2022 Hulu series Reboot.

Early life and education 
Alyah Chanelle Scott grew up in Pearland, Texas, a suburb of Houston. Her mother is a NASA aerospace engineer and her father works in finance at a car company. She attended Glenda Dawson High School, graduating in 2015.

She received a BFA from the University of Michigan's musical theatre program.

Career 
Scott spent various summers performing in productions at Music Theatre Wichita, including The Hunchback of Notre Dame and Pippin. While in her senior year of college, Scott landed the role of Nabulungi, the female lead in The Book of Mormon, for the musical's U.S. national tour. She joined the tour in July 2019 and performed in hundreds of shows through early 2020 when its shows were canceled due to the COVID-19 pandemic.

Scott starred on Mindy Kaling's The Sex Lives of College Girls, as Whitney Chase, which premiered on HBO Max on November 18, 2021. The show was renewed for a second season.

Scott also starred in Steve Levitan's Reboot, as Timberly Fox, which premiered on Hulu on September 20, 2022.

Filmography

Television

Stage

External links

References 

1997 births
Living people
University of Michigan alumni
Actresses from Houston
African-American actresses
American television actresses
American stage actresses
People from Pearland, Texas
21st-century American actresses